The 1982 Campeonato Paulista da Primeira Divisão de Futebol Profissional was the 81st season of São Paulo's top professional football league. Corinthians  won the championship by the 18th time. Francana was relegated.

Championship
The twenty teams of the championship would all play twice against each other, with the team with the fewest points being relegated, and the second team with the fewest points going to a relegation playoff against the Second level's runner-up. The best teams of each half of the championship would qualify to the Finals, with the title being awarded automatically if the same team won both rounds. In addition to that, the regulation also had provisions for certain scenarios regarding the champions and runners-up of each round.

Relegation Playoffs
According to the original regulation, Francana would be relegated directly to the Second level, being replaced by the champion of the Second level, Taquaritinga, and XV de Jaú would have to play a relegation playoff in neutral ground against Bragantino, runner-up of the Second Level. However, only a few days after the end of the championship, FPF's vice-president declared that the relegation that year would be cancelled, since Taquaritinga and Bragantino's stadiums didn't meet FPF requirements. this sparked a lengthy court battle that ended with the original regulation being upheld, and Bragantino being allowed to play the playoff match against XV de Jaú, with the playoffs beginning only in May 1983. XV de Jaú won the first match by 3-2, and after holding Bragantino to a tie in the return match, managed to remain in the first level.

|}

Finals

|}

References

Campeonato Paulista seasons
Paulista